Radio Television of Djibouti (RTD) is the national broadcaster of Djibouti. The station is based in Djibouti city and the only media outlet of the country. RTD is broadcasting in Arabic, French, Afar and Somali.

In addition to RTD, the country's government does not allow any other broadcasters. According to Reporters Without Borders, RTD is used for government propaganda. The opposition broadcaster La Voix de Djibouti broadcast for ten years as an online radio from Belgium, in June 2020 it resumed terrestrial broadcasting on a rented station from Bulgaria via shortwave.

RTD operates a powerful medium wave transmitter that broadcasts the Arabic-language US-governmental program Radio Sawa for all of East Africa.

History

The channel began broadcasting in the 1940s, during the colonial period in French Somaliland. In 1967, the Office of French Radio and Television (ORTF) installed a regional station overseas in Djibouti City. The city is today a center for broadcast media and hosts a number of radio and television stations.

Radio Television of Djibouti is a general news and entertainment channel.

The broadcasting schedule is composed of news, cultural programs, series, entertainment and variety. Through Badr-4 satellite, the station's transmission can be received in North Africa, Europe, the Near and Middle East. Some of its programs are also streamed on the internet.

Notes

References

External links
Official site

Publicly funded broadcasters
Arabic-language television stations
Somali-language radio stations
French-language television networks
Television channels in Djibouti
Television channels and stations established in 1966
State media